Planorbella oregonensis is a species of gastropod belonging to the family Planorbidae.

The species is found in Western North America.

Per IUCN, the species has the status "vulnerable".

References

Planorbidae
Gastropods described in 1865